Trust No One is the seventh studio album by American heavy metal band DevilDriver. It was released on May 13, 2016, via Napalm Records. It is the first DevilDriver album since rhythm guitarist Jeff Kendrick and drummer John Boecklin departed and were replaced by Neal Tiemann and Austin D'Amond, respectively. During the writing process, DevilDriver recruited a new bassist, Diego "Ashes" Ibarra.

Track listing 
All lyrics by Dez Fafara and all music by Mike Spreitzer, Neal Tiemann and Austin D'Amond.

Personnel 
 Dez Fafara: vocals
 Mike Spreitzer: lead guitar, bass, programming
 Neal Tiemann: rhythm guitar, bass
 Austin D'Amond: drums
 Mark Lewis: producer

Charts

References 

2016 albums
DevilDriver albums
Napalm Records albums
Albums produced by Mark Lewis (music producer)